The 2018 Indonesia Masters, officially the Daihatsu Indonesia Masters 2018, was a badminton tournament which took place at Istora Gelora Bung Karno in Jakarta, Indonesia, from 23 to 28 January 2018 and had a total prize of US$350,000.

Tournament
The 2018 Indonesia Masters was the third tournament of the 2018 BWF World Tour and also part of the Indonesia Masters championships which had been held since 2010. This tournament was organized by the Badminton Association of Indonesia with sanction from the BWF.

Venue
This international tournament was held at Istora Gelora Bung Karno in Jakarta, Indonesia. This was the first sporting event held there since its reopening after undergoing major renovation.

Point distribution
Below is a table with the point distribution for each phase of the tournament based on the BWF points system for the BWF World Tour Super 500 event.

Prize money
The total prize money for the 2018 tournament was US$350,000. Distribution of prize money was in accordance with BWF regulations.

Men's singles

Seeds

 Viktor Axelsen (second round)
 Srikanth Kidambi (withdrew)
 Chen Long (quarterfinals)
 Son Wan-ho (semifinals)
 Lin Dan (first round)
 Chou Tien-chen (semifinals)
 Ng Ka Long (first round)
 H. S. Prannoy (withdrew)

Finals

Top half

Section 1

Section 2

Bottom half

Section 3

Section 4

Women's singles

Seeds

 Tai Tzu-ying  (champion) 
 P. V. Sindhu (quarterfinals)
 Carolina Marín (quarterfinals)
 Ratchanok Intanon (semifinals)
 Sung Ji-hyun (quarterfinals)
 Nozomi Okuhara (quarterfinals)
 Chen Yufei (first round)
 He Bingjiao (semifinals)

Finals

Top half

Section 1

Section 2

Bottom half

Section 3

Section 4

Men's doubles

Seeds

 Marcus Fernaldi Gideon / Kevin Sanjaya Sukamuljo (champions) 
 Li Junhui / Liu Yuchen (final) 
 Liu Cheng / Zhang Nan (semifinals)
 Mads Conrad-Petersen / Mads Pieler Kolding (quarterfinals)
 Lee Jhe-huei / Lee Yang (second round)
 Vladimir Ivanov / Ivan Sozonov (second round)
 Chen Hung-ling / Wang Chi-lin (quarterfinals)
 Takuto Inoue / Yuki Kaneko (first round)

Finals

Top half

Section 1

Section 2

Bottom half

Section 3

Section 4

Women's doubles

Seeds

 Chen Qingchen / Jia Yifan (second round)
 Misaki Matsutomo / Ayaka Takahashi (champions)
 Kamilla Rytter Juhl / Christinna Pedersen (semifinals)
 Shiho Tanaka / Koharu Yonemoto (withdrew)
 Lee So-hee / Shin Seung-chan (semifinals)
 Jongkolphan Kititharakul / Rawinda Prajongjai (quarterfinals)
 Chang Ye-na / Jung Kyung-eun (quarterfinals)
 Greysia Polii / Apriyani Rahayu (final)

Finals

Top half

Section 1

Section 2

Bottom half

Section 3

Section 4

Mixed doubles

Seeds

 Tontowi Ahmad / Liliyana Natsir (final)
 Wang Yilü / Huang Dongping (first round)
 Chris Adcock / Gabrielle Adcock (withdrew)
 Tang Chun Man / Tse Ying Suet (quarterfinals)
 Seo Seung-jae / Kim Ha-na (second round)
 Zheng Siwei / Huang Yaqiong (champions)
 Tan Kian Meng / Lai Pei Jing (quarterfinals)
 Mathias Christiansen / Christina Pedersen (second round)

Finals

Top half

Section 1

Section 2

Bottom half

Section 3

Section 4

References

External links
 Tournament Link

Indonesian Masters (badminton)
Indonesia Masters
Masters (badminton)
Indonesia Masters (badminton)